Henry W. Doll (born 1870 in New York City) was an American manufacturer and politician from New York.

Life
He attended public and parochial schools. Then he engaged in the manufacture of cigars.

Doll was a member of the New York State Assembly (New York County, 14th D.) in 1902 and 1903.

He was Sergeant-at-Arms of the New York State Senate in 1913 and 1914.

He was a member of the New York State Senate (12th D.) in 1915 and 1916.

Sources
Official New York from Cleveland to Hughes by Charles Elliott Fitch (Hurd Publishing Co., New York and Buffalo, 1911, Vol. IV; pg. 345 and 347)
The New York Red Book by Edgar L. Murlin (1903; pg. 128)

1870 births
Year of death missing
Democratic Party New York (state) state senators
People from Manhattan
Democratic Party members of the New York State Assembly